"", also known by its incipit, "", is the national anthem of Kiribati. It was by written and composed by Ioteba Tamuera Uriam and adopted upon independence on 12 July 1979. Its lyrics were confirmed as per Schedule 3 of the National Identity Act 1989.

History 
The anthem was selected after a nationwide song competition to find a national anthem. Among those who participated in the competition were local composer and Protestant missionary Rev. Tom Toakai.

Lyrics
According to the National Identity Act 1989, the piece is to be sung at an andante tempo of 108.

Notes

References

External links

National symbols of Kiribati
National anthems
Kiribati music
Oceanian anthems
National anthem compositions in B-flat major